SAFTI is a subzone of the Jurong West planning area of Singapore. It is home to the Pasir Laba Camp. It is also the training ground and a live-firing area for Singapore Armed Forces known as SAFTI Live Firing Area which is west of Pasir Laba Camp.

It is bounded west of Upper Jurong Road, which is the only part of Western Water Catchment to name it Pasir Laba. So far, no developments are announced currently, unless Pasir Laba Green and SAFTI West new residential developments will be built.

Pasir Laba Road
Pasir Laba Road is a short stretch from Upper Jurong Road and terminating at Tengah Pumping Station via the SAFTI live firing ranges, Pasir Laba Camp and Multi-Mission Range Complex. Part of the Pasir Laba Road was broken up and renamed to Wrexham Avenue which has restricted access for the Matador and M210 Ranges.

Hilltops
There are some hills in Pasir Laba. They are Peng Kang Hill, FOFO Hill, Bunker Hill and Elephant Hill.

Accessibility
It is accessible by route 182/182M from Joo Koon Bus Interchange.

Politics
Prior to 1997 general elections, it is under the Jurong constituency. From 1997 to 2001, it is bounded by Bukit Timah GRC (Jurong) and Hong Kah GRC (Nanyang). From 2001 to 2011, it is bounded by West Coast GRC (Pioneer) and Hong Kah GRC (Nanyang), then from 2011 to 2020, it surrounds the boundaries of Chua Chu Kang GRC (Nanyang) and West Coast GRC (Ayer Rajah). Since 2020 general elections, it is fully under West Coast GRC (Nanyang and Ayer Rajah), the MPs are under Ang Wei Neng and Foo Mee Har.

Places in Singapore
Western Water Catchment